Hokkaido Sapporo Asahigaoka High School (北海道札幌旭丘高等学校, Hokkaidō Sapporo Asahigaoka Kōtō Gakkō) is a high school in Sapporo, Hokkaido, Japan, founded in 1958.

Notable alumni
Ryoko Yamagishi (山岸 凉子) Japanese manga artist.
Yumiko Igarashi (いがらし ゆみこ) Japanese manga artist.

Address
Address: Asahigaoka 6-5-18, Chūō-ku, Hokkaido, Japan

External links
The Official Website of Hokkaido Sapporo Asahigaoka High School

High schools in Hokkaido
Educational institutions established in 1958
1958 establishments in Japan